Pulaski Day can refer to a number of holidays commemorating Polish militia leader Casimir Pulaski

Casimir Pulaski Day, held on the first Monday of March (coinciding with Pulaski's birthday)
General Pulaski Memorial Day, held on October 11 (the anniversary of Pulaski's death)
Pulaski Day (Western New York), held on the third Sunday of July